John R. Perry (November 12, 1954) is a Retired Wyoming State District Judge who served primarily in the Sixth Judicial District, which consists of Campbell,  Crook, and Weston Counties, Wyoming.  He was appointed to the bench in 2000 by Governor Jim Geringer and successfully stood for retention in 2002, 2008, 2014, and 2020. As part of his duties, Perry served for 11 years on Wyoming's Board of Judicial Policy and Administration. Perry currently serves as chair of the Judicial Branch Innovation Task Force, which consists of three Supreme Court Justices, three District Judges, and three Circuit Court Judges.

Prior to joining the bench, Perry served eight years as a member of the Wyoming State Senate for the Campbell and Johnson Counties senatorial district.  He  eventually became Chair of the Judiciary Committee.  Among his legislative efforts, he was the prime sponsor of the Wyoming Government Reorganization Act of 1989, which was signed into law by Governor Mike Sullivan.  In 1994, he unsuccessfully ran for Governor of Wyoming, losing in the Republican Primary to Governor Jim Geringer.

Perry received his undergraduate degree from the University of Utah and his law degree from the University of Wyoming.

References 

Wyoming state court judges
Republican Party Wyoming state senators
University of Utah alumni
University of Wyoming College of Law alumni
1954 births
Living people